Copromorpha fossilis is an extinct species of moth in the Copromorphidae family. It was described from the Bembridge Marls of the Isle of Wight, a rock formation of Oligocene age, about 35 million years old.

References

Natural History Museum Lepidoptera generic names catalog

Copromorphidae
Fossil Lepidoptera
Oligocene insects
Fossils of Great Britain
Fossil taxa described in 1980